Colombier-le-Vieux is a commune in the Ardèche department in southern France.

Population

See also
Communes of the Ardèche department
Used as the location for the 1972 BBC Television series Clochemerle

References

Communes of Ardèche
Ardèche communes articles needing translation from French Wikipedia